Başpınar Nature Park is a nature park in Isparta Province, Turkey

It was declared a nature park by the Ministry of Forest and Water Management on 11 July 2011. It is situated in the valley of a tributary of Aksu River and to the east of Sorgun Dam. Its elevation is 
Nearby visitor attractions are the dam or the Zindan Cave.

References

Nature parks in Turkey
Tourist attractions in Isparta Province
Aksu District (Isparta)
2011 establishments in Turkey
Protected areas established in 2011